The 12111/12112 Amravati Express is a Superfast Express train belonging to Indian Railways that runs between Mumbai CST and Amravati Terminus in India. It is a daily service. 
It operates as train number 12111 from Mumbai to Amravati and as train number 12112 in the reverse direction.
This train was introduced on 7 September 2008.

Read more and Book AMI EXPRESS from here.

Coaches

12111/12112  Amravati Express presently has 1 AC 1st Class cum AC 2 tier, 2 AC 2 tier, 4 AC 3 tier, 8 Sleeper Class, 3 General Unreserved and 1 SLR (Seating Cum Luggage Van) coache and 1 EOG.

References

External links 

 12111/Mumbai CSMT - Amravati SF Express
 12112/Amravati - Mumbai CSMT SF Express

Express trains in India
Rail transport in Maharashtra
Transport in Mumbai
Transport in Amravati
Railway services introduced in 2008